8-Hydroxy-5-deazaflavin:NADPH oxidoreductase (8-OH-5dFl:NADPH oxidoreductase) is an enzyme with systematic name reduced coenzyme F420:NADP+ oxidoreductase. This enzyme catalyses the following chemical reaction

 reduced coenzyme F420 + NADP+  coenzyme F420 + NADPH + H+

The enzyme requires the 5-deazaflavin structure, as well as an 8-hydroxy group in the substrate.

References

External links 
 

EC 1.5.1